Xyrichtys incandescens, the Brazilian razorfish, is a species of marine ray-finned fish from the family Labridae, the wrasses. Found in the Western Atlantic Ocean.

Etymology
The fishes name means glowing.

References

incandescens
Taxa named by Alasdair James Edwards
Taxa named by Roger Lubbock
Fish described in 1981